Subramaniam, Subrahmanyam, Subramanyam or Subramanian is a South Indian male given name. Due to the South Indian tradition of using patronymic surnames it may also be a surname for males and females. The etymology of the name is from Sanskrit; however, a common translation is "dear to Brahmam", or "of good deeds". An alternative proposed translation is derived from merging two common Sanskrit words supri-ya (सु), meaning "good" or "dear," and man-ya, meaning jewel; the name translates loosely as "worthy jewel". Subramaniam is one of the many names of the Hindu god Karthikeya, also known as Kumara or Murugan.

In Telugu, Subrahmanyam or Subramanyam is the transliteration of the name (closer to the Sanskrit root word).

Notable people
 A. L. Subramanian, Indian politician
 Chidambaram Subramaniam (1910–2000), Indian politician
 E. M. Subramaniam (1948-2015), Indian musician
 G. Subramania Iyer (1855–1916), Indian journalist
 K. Subrahmanyam (1929–2011), Indian strategist
 K. A. Subramaniam (1931-1989), Sri Lankan politician
 Ka. Naa. Subramanyam (1912–1988), Indian author
 K. G. Subramanyan (1924-2016), Indian artist
 Kandala Subrahmanyam (1920-2018), Indian lawyer
 Krishnaswami Subrahmanyam (1904–1971), Indian film director
 L. Subramaniam (born 1947), Indian musician
 M. Arun Subramanian, Indian politician
 M. Subramaniam, Indian politician
 M. G. Subramaniam (born 1932), Indian cricket umpire
 M. M. Subramaniam (c. 1870–1945), Ceylonese politician
 M.P.Subramaniam, Indian politician
 Mas Subramanian, Indian chemist
 Mukkur N. Subramanian, Indian politician
 Musiri Subramania Iyer, Indian singer
 N. Subramanian, Indian politician
 N. Subramanian Chettiar, Indian politician
 O. Subramanian, Indian politician
 Olappamanna Subramanian Namboothirippad, Malayalam poet
 P. Subramaniam, Indian film director
 P S Subramanyam (born 1950), Indian scientist
 Patnam Subramania Iyer, Indian music composer
 R. C. Subramanian, Indian politician
 Sattur A. G. Subramaniam (1916–1977), Indian musician
 P. V. Subramaniam (1917–2007), Indian music critic
 S. Pakkur Subramanyan, Indian politician
 S. Subramania Iyer (1842–1924), Indian lawyer
 S. Subramaniam (footballer) (born 1985), Malaysian footballer
 Subramaniam Chettiar (1901–1975), Indian journalist
 Subramaniam Sathasivam (born 1953), Malaysian politician
 Subramaniam Sinniah (born 1944), Malaysian politician
 Subramaniam Siva, Indian film director,
 Subramanian (GC) (died 1944), Indian soldier and George Cross recipient
 Subramaniya Siva (1884–1925), Indian writer
 Subramanya Nagarajarao, Indian author
 T. Subramanian, Indian politician
 T. R. Subramaniam (1929–2013), Indian musician
 T. S. R. Subramanian, Indian civil servant
 V. Subramanian, Indian politician
 V. M. Subramanian, Indian politician
 V. N. Subramanian, Indian politician
 Venkataraman Subramanya (born 1936), Indian cricketer

Surname

 Amanchi Venkata Subrahmanyam (1957–2013), Indian journalist
 Ambi Subramaniam (born 1991), American musician
 Annapurni Subramaniam, Indian physicist
 Arundhathi Subramaniam, Indian poet
 Arvind Subramanian, Indian economist
 Avanidhar Subrahmanyam, American academic
 Babu Subramaniam, American television director
 Bachimanchi Venkata Subrahmanyam Ravi (born 1974), Indian writer
 Batlagundu Subramanian Ramiah (1905–1983), Indian writer
 Bindu Subramaniam, American musician
 Bouloussou Soubramanion Sastroulou (1866–1941), Indian judge
 Chittoor Subramaniam Pillai (1898–1975), Indian musician
 Chittur Subramanian Venkiteswaran (born 1956), Indian film critic
 Chitra Subramaniam, Indian journalist
 Dasari Subrahmanyam (born 1932), Indian author
 Dharmavarapu Subramanyam (1963–2013), Indian film actor and director
 Gopal Subramaniam, Indian lawyer
 Kavita Subramaniam, Indian film playback singer
 Krishna Subramanian, American businessman
 Kumar Subramaniam (born 1979), Malaysian hockey player
 Manayangath Subramanian Viswanathan (1928–2015), Indian composer
 Mani Subramanian, Indian businessman
 Marti G. Subrahmanyam, Indian academic
 Namini Subrahmanyam Naidu, Indian author
 Natarajan Subramaniam, Indian cinematographer
 Padma Subrahmanyam (born 1943), Indian dancer
 Padmanabhan Subramanian Poti (1923–1998), Indian judge
 Palani Subramaniam Pillai (1908–1962), Indian musician
 Parivakkam Subramaniam Veeraraghavan (born 1948), Indian space scientist
 Ramya Subramanian, Indian actress
 Ravi Subramanyam, Indian cricket umpire
 Ravi Subramanian, Indian author
 Samanth Subramanian, Indian writer
 Sanjay Subrahmanyam (born 1961), Indian historian
 Sanjay Subrahmanyan (born 1968), Indian musician
 Shashank Subramanyam, Indian musician
 Shiv Kumar Subramaniam, Indian actor
 Siva Subrahmanyam Banda (born 1951), American engineer
 Subrahmanyam Jaishankar (born 1955), Indian diplomat
 Subrahmanyan Chandrasekhar (1910–1995), Indian physicist
 Subramania Bharati (1882–1921), Indian writer
 Subramaniam Badrinath (born 1980), Indian cricketer
 Subramaniam Kunanlan (born 1986), Malaysian footballer
 Subramaniam Mohanadas, Sri Lankan chemist and academic
 Subramaniam Pillai, Indian politician
 Subramaniam Ramachandran, Sri Lankan journalist
 Subramaniam Ramadorai (born 1945), Indian engineer
 Subramaniam Sivapalan (c1890–1960), Ceylonese politician
 Subramaniam V. Iyer (born 1957), Indian businessman
 Subramaniam Veenod (born 1988), Malaysian footballer
 Subramanian Anand (born 1986), Sri Lankan cricketer
 Subramanian Arun Prasad (born 1988), Indian chess player
 Subramanian Krishnamoorthy (1929–2014), Indian author
 Subramanian Swamy (born 1939), Indian politician
 Subramanyan Ramaswamy, Indian politician
 Sunil Subramaniam (born 1967), Indian cricketer
 Tekur Subramanyam, Indian politician
 Uma Subramaniam, Indian banker
 Vidya Subramaniam (born 1957), Indian author
 Vidya Subramanian, Indian musician
 Vijayalakshmy Subramaniam, Indian singer
 Viji Subramaniam (1952–1995), Indian musician
 Vincent Subramaniam (born 1955), Singaporean football coach

Other uses

Films

 Ganesha Subramanya, 1992 Kannada film
 Ravi Subramanyam, 2014 Telugu film
 Santosh Subramaniam, 2008 Tamil film
 Subramanyam for Sale, 2015 Telugu film
 Subramaniya Swamy, 1994 Tamil film
 Yevade Subramanyam, 2015 Telugu film

Characters
 Caleb Subramanian, a character introduced in Season 4 of The Walking Dead.

Places
 Subramanya, Karnataka, village in Karnataka
 Subramanyapuram, village in Tamil Nadu

Temples
 Thiruparankundram Subramaniya Swamy temple, Madurai, Tamil Nadu
Thiruchendur Subramaniya Swamy temple, Tamil Nadu
Thiruttani Subramaniya Swamy temple, Tamil Nadu
Ghati Subramanya, Karnataka

 Kukke Subramanya Temple, Karnataka

See also
 
 
 
 
 
 

Tamil masculine given names
Telugu names